The 17th Infantry Brigade was an infantry brigade formation of the British Army which provided active service in the Second Boer War and both the First and Second World Wars. It was mainly composed of Regular Army battalions.

History

Second Boer War
During the Second Boer War, the 17th brigade was active in South Africa as part of the 8th Division from early 1900 until the war ended in 1902. It was under the command of Major-General John Edward Boyes, and included the following battalions:
2nd Battalion Manchester Regiment, 1st Battalion South Staffordshire Regiment, 1st Battalion Worcestershire Regiment, 2nd Battalion West Kent Regiment

First World War
The 17th Brigade was originally part of the 6th Division during the First World War, The commander was Brigadier General W.R.B. Doran CB DSO on mobilisation. It was transferred to the 24th Division, a New Army division, on 14 October 1915. The brigade saw service mainly on the Western Front.

Order of battle

On mobilisation - August 1914
Component units included:
 1st Battalion, Royal Fusiliers (City of London Regiment)
 1st Battalion, Prince of Wales's (North Staffordshire Regiment)
 2nd Battalion, Prince of Wales's Leinster Regiment (Royal Canadians)
 3rd Battalion, Rifle Brigade (Prince Consort's Own)

November 1918
Component units included:
 8th (Service) Battalion, Queen's (Royal West Surrey Regiment)
 1st Battalion, Royal Fusiliers (City of London Regiment)
 3rd Battalion, Rifle Brigade (Prince Consort's Own)
 17th Trench Mortar Battery

Second World War
The Brigade served with the 5th Infantry Division through most of the Second World War. On 5 May 1942 it was part of Force 121 in the Battle of Madagascar. After this, the 17th Infantry Brigade served in the Allied invasion of Sicily with the British Eighth Army and the Italian Campaign, before taking part in the closing stages of the campaign in Germany.

Order of battle 
Component units included:
 2nd Battalion, Royal Scots Fusiliers
 2nd Battalion, Northamptonshire Regiment
 2nd Battalion, Seaforth Highlanders (to 30 March 1940)
 6th Battalion, Seaforth Highlanders (from 30 March 1940)
 156th (Lanarkshire Yeomanry) Field Regiment, Royal Artillery

Notes

References

External links
 

Infantry brigades of the British Army in World War I
Infantry brigades of the British Army in World War II